Anna Müller may refer to:

 Anna-Maria Müller (1949–2009), East German sportswoman
 Anna Müller, a Swiss-German equivalent to Jane Doe
 Anna Müller, a member of the Austrian electronic musical duo HVOB

With double names:
 Anna Müller-Lincke (1869-1935) German stage and film actress